The Dominican Republic maintained official relations with the Republic of China (commonly referred to as China before 1949 and Taiwan after 1949) from 1944 to 2018. At the time it broke relations, it was the largest economy amongst the 19 UN member states to have had fully recognized the Republic of China as the sole legitimate representative of all of China.

On April 30, 2018, the Dominican Republic announced they were severing diplomatic relations with Taiwan and would establish relations with the People's Republic of China, recognizing Taiwan as an "inalienable part of Chinese territory". Although this decision was mostly due in part to political reasons, and not that of the general public. A recent survey suggests that 71% of Dominicans want to restore relations with Taiwan, and some even see China as a threat to democracy and Dominican Republic's sovereignty. It was suggested that Dominicans were angry about the Chinese embassy's perceived meddling in internal political affairs when a senator criticized the then-ruling government of Danilo Medina for being too friendly with China. Luis Abinader, who was later elected in the 2020 Dominican Republic general election, has praised Taiwan for its success handling the coronavirus.

Diplomatic missions and personnel
Taiwan's former embassy in the Dominican Republic was located in the Bella Vista neighbourhood of Santo Domingo. The Dominican Republic's former embassy was located in the Shilin District of Taipei. Víctor Manuel Sánchez Peña served as Dominican Republic's ambassador in Taipei from 1997 to 2000 and again from 2004 to 2011.

In April 2012, Julia Ou (區美珍), an Overseas Compatriot Affairs Commission official attached to Taipei's embassy, was found stabbed to death in the bedroom of her Santo Domingo apartment. The murder remained unsolved by the end of the year.

Bilateral visits
In August 2008, Taiwanese President Ma Ying-jeou visited Santo Domingo and met Dominican Republic President Leonel Fernández. They agreed that the two countries would begin to push for the signing of a free trade agreement.

References

External links
 Embassy of the Republic of China in the Dominican Republic 
 Embassy of the Republic of China in the Dominican Republic 

 
Bilateral relations of Taiwan
Taiwan